Little Saigon, San Diego is a Vietnamese enclave in City Heights, San Diego, located on El Cajon Boulevard between Euclid and Highland avenues.

History 
The Little Saigon San Diego Foundation was established in November 2008 with a stated mission to "revitalize the densely populated Vietnamese business district of El Cajon Boulevard."

On June 4, 2013, City Council approved Little Saigon Cultural and Commercial District in City Heights, which is a six-block section of El Cajon Boulevard from Euclid to Highland avenues. The district would be known as a center for Vietnamese food and culture. Since 2013, the Little Saigon San Diego Foundation has organized one of the Vietnamese new year (Tết) events in the city with the annual Lunar New Year festival at the SDCCU Stadium (formerly known as Qualcomm Stadium), where proceeds would go towards developing and promoting the district. The foundation's festival is a separate event and does not have any affiliation with the  San Diego Tết Festival organized by VAYA (Vietnamese-American Youth Alliance), which was established in 2006 and annually held at Mira Mesa Community Park.

On February 1, 2019, the Little Saigon signs were revealed to be installed near El Cajon Boulevard exits on Interstate 15.

See also 

 Asian Pacific Thematic Historic District

References

External links 

 littlesaigonsandiego.org

Neighborhoods in San Diego
Little Saigons
Ethnic enclaves in California
Vietnamese-American culture in California